

See also 2016 in birding and ornithology, main events of 2017 and 2018 in birding and ornithology
The year 2017 in birding and ornithology.

Worldwide

New species

See also Bird species new to science described in the 2010s

Taxonomic developments
The British Ornithologists' Union announced that it would adopt the IOC World Bird List from 1 January 2018.

Ornithologists

Deaths
 James Ferguson-Lees (born 1929)

World listing

Europe

Britain

Breeding birds
 Night heron (Nycticorax nycticorax) recorded successfully breeding for the first time in Britain. Two birds fledged at the Westhay Moor National Nature Reserve, managed by the Somerset Wildlife Trust.
 A number of hen harriers (Circus cyaneus) disappeared in suspicious circumstances over land managed for grouse shooting. There were only three successful nests in England.

Migrant and wintering birds

Rare birds

Other events
 According to the RSPB's Birdcrime report, there were 68 confirmed incidents of raptor persecution in the UK, with shooting the most common method. There was four prosecutions and one conviction.

Ireland

North America
To be completed

References

Birding and ornithology
Bird
Birding and ornithology by year